Sergey Fesenko Jr. (also spelled as Sergiy or Serhiy, born June 5, 1982) is a long-distance freestyle swimmer from Ukraine. He competed in the 2000 Olympic Games in Sydney, Australia, 2004 Olympic Games in Athens, Greece and qualified to represent his country at the 2008 Olympic Games in Beijing, China. His father, Sergey Fesenko, Sr., won the gold medal in the 200m butterfly at the 1980 Olympic Games in Moscow. 

Fesenko is a citizen of the United States and   resided in Indiana. He has a Masters (from IU) in Economic Sciences.  He served in the Ukrainian military in an Air Defense unit but did not see combat.

Titles

Fina World Cup 
  Berlin 2003: 400m freestyle
  New York 2004: 1500m freestyle
  New York 2004:  400m freestyle

External links 
 Profile on Indiana University-website
 

1982 births
Living people
Ukrainian male freestyle swimmers
Ukrainian male swimmers
Male long-distance swimmers
Olympic swimmers of Ukraine
Swimmers at the 2000 Summer Olympics
Swimmers at the 2004 Summer Olympics
Swimmers at the 2008 Summer Olympics
Universiade medalists in swimming
Universiade silver medalists for Ukraine
Universiade bronze medalists for Ukraine
Medalists at the 2007 Summer Universiade
Sportspeople from Kyiv